Colin Lynes (born 26 November 1977) is a British former professional boxer who competed from 1998 to 2017. He held the IBO super lightweight title from 2004 to 2005. At regional level, he held the British super lightweight title in 2007; the EBU European super lightweight title from 2007 to 2008; and the British welterweight title from 2011 to 2012.

Boxing career

Early professional career
Lynes begun his pro career in June 1998 with a 1st-round knockout of Lee Frost at the Broadway Theatre in Barking, London.  He continued with 3 more quick victories over Ram Singh, Brian Coleman and Trevor Smith before finally completing the distance against Marc Smith. However hand problems in his next fight against Dennis Griffin forced him to develop an effective counter punching style. After compiling an unbeaten ledger of 20–0 he found himself in December 2002 competing for the IBO inter-continental light welterweight title, winning by 9th round tko against American Richard Kiley.  He lost the title however in his next fight, when at the York Hall he was stopped in the 8th round by South African Samuel Malinga.

Championship fights
Following the defeat Lynes regrouped by winning his next three fights setting himself up for a shot at the full IBO light welterweight champion Argentinian Daniel Sarmiento.  The fight at the Goresbrook Leisure Center in Dagenham in May 2005 ended with a split decision victory for the Englishman.  This time he made his first defence a successful one when in Brentwood, Essex he met American Juaquin Gallardo winning by majority decision.

In October 2005 Lynes met fellow Brit Junior Witter for the British, Commonwealth and European titles losing a 12-round decision.  He followed this defeat by losing again, this time to Lenny Daws still a 12–0 prospect for the English Southern Area title.  The fight which ended with Lynes being stopped in the 9th round also doubled as an eliminator for the full British title with Daws going on to win the full crown.

British and European Champion
Lynes regrouped from his back to back defeats with two wins before in June 2007 he met Scotsman Barry Morrison for the full British title.  The fight which took place at the Civic Center in Motherwell ended with Lynes claiming victory after 12 rounds. He defended the title in his next fight which also saw Lynes compete for the vacant European title.  The opponent was Wolverhampton's Young Mutley, the former British Welterweight champion, the fight ended with an 8th round win for Lynes who was now a double champion. The Finnish fighter Juho Tolppola was next in line for Lynes for his first defence of his European crown with the fight ending in another 12 round win for the Englishman.

An Italian job was next for Lynes as he met mandatory challenger Gianluca Branco in Italy for his next defence.  To defend against the Italian he had to give up his British belt which was subsequently won by Manchester's David Barnes.  The fight itself ended in disappointment for Lynes as he lost a close split decision to the former World title challenger despite putting his opponent down in the 2nd round. Following the loss to Branco, Lynes was next in line to fight for his old British title against David Barnes.  With one week to go Barnes pulled out of the fight and was stripped of the title leaving Lynes to fight for the now vacant title against Northern Irishman Paul McCloskey.  McCloskey ended up winning the fight when Lynes retired in the 9th round.

The victory for McCloskey over Lynes meant that he became the mandatory challenger for Lynes' old European belt which was now vacant, only for a hand injury to rule the Irishman out only two weeks before the fight.  McCloskeys lost opportunity was Lynes gain as he was drafted in to fight for the title against Frenchman Souleymane M'baye, a former WBA world champion in Paris on 3 July 2009. The fight was another close one for the former champion as he lost via split decision.

Prizefighter and Commonwealth title challenge
On 4 December 2009 Lynes competed in Sky's Prizefighter knock out style tournament.  The competition included a number of successful British light welterweight boxers from recent years with Lynes winning two contests to reach the final.  The draw for the competition which had been made by Floyd Mayweather pitted Lynes against David Barnes, the man who had succeeded Lynes as British champion in the quarter finals.  A split decision win over Barnes moved Lynes into the semi's to meet former victim Young Mutley and emerge victorious for the second time against the man from Wolverhampton via another split decision.  The final saw Lynes compete with Newbridge's Gavin Rees, a man who had briefly held the World WBA light welterweight championship in 2007 and who was supported at ringside by former stablemate Joe Calzaghe.  Rees, who had knocked out former European champions Ted Bami and Jason Cook on the way the final, won with a unanimous decision over Lynes, himself a former European champion.

Lynes return to the ring following the Prizefighter tournament saw him compete on the undercard of David Hayes world heavyweight title defence against John Ruiz at the MEN Arena in Manchester.  His opponent, Ajose Olusegun, a Nigerian with British nationality was undefeated in 27 fights and was ranked at number 2 by the WBC.  The fight, on 3 April 2010, resulted in Olusegun retaining his title after a stomach problem caused by a series of bodyshots had Lynes gasping for breath and him been counted out in the 8th round.  Following the fight Lynes blamed the problems recovering from the shots on problems he had making the weight for the fight and said he would consider moving up a weight.

Move to Welterweight
Lynes moved up a weight division in his next fight on 12 February 2012 against Bradley Pryce, defeating the Welshman in an close 8 round contest in Liverpool with the referee handing victory to Lynes 78–77. On 7 June 2011 Lynes once again took part in the Prizefighter tournament although this time it was the welterweight version at the York Hall in Bethnal Green.  He reached the semi-finals beating his stablemate Bobby Gladman in the quarter finals but losing to eventual winner Yassine El Maachi with a controversial split decision in the semi's. On 9 November 2011 Lynes challenged Lee Purdy for the British welterweight championship, winning after 12 rounds via majority decision.

References

 
 

 

Living people
1977 births
Light-welterweight boxers
People from Hornchurch
Prizefighter contestants
English male boxers
International Boxing Organization champions
Boxers from Greater London